Tahir Yahya (1916 – 1986) was Prime Minister of Iraq twice, from 1963 to 1965 and a short term in 1967–1968. He was educated at the Baghdad Military College and the Staff College. Born in Tikrit 1916. He was the 4th child to Mulla Yahya el-ogaily, a prominent tobacco merchant between North and Central Iraq. At the age of sixteen, he joined the Baghdad Teachers College, then became a teacher in Baghdad for one year after graduation. He then pursued further education in military sciences. He was a cavalry officer and played polo for the Iraqi army. He led the Iraqi armored company where he was wounded in the battle at the Kfar Masaryk , earning two medals bestowed by Crown Prince Abd al-Ilāh.

In November 1963 he was appointed as Prime Minister by President Abdul Salam Arif.

At the end of his term, Yahya warned president Arif of the upcoming Ba'ath coup d'état and their plans to overthrow his government, but Arif did not take any action. This led to Yahya submitting his resignation on 8 July 1968, one week before the coup d'état took place. That same morning Yahya was arrested and Arif was deported to London.

Yahya spent three years in prison, torture, and health neglect. In 1971 he was released, only to be put under house arrest until dying in his house in Mansur, Baghdad, in 1986.

References

External links

1916 births
1986 deaths
Arab Socialist Union (Iraq) politicians
Iraqi Muslims
Iraqi people of Circassian descent
Members of the Regional Command of the Arab Socialist Ba'ath Party – Iraq Region
Prime Ministers of Iraq
Iraqi Military Academy alumni